Bufetolol is a beta-adrenoceptor antagonist.

References

Beta blockers
Tetrahydrofurans
N-tert-butyl-phenoxypropanolamines
Catechol ethers